Monte Cristo was a sternwheel steamboat which was operated in Puget Sound and the coastal rivers of the state of Washington and the province of British Columbia.

Career
The sources are in some conflict as to the early career of this vessel. According to one source, Monte Cristo was built in 1891 in Everett, Washington.  According to another source, Monte Cristo was built in Ballard, Washington, by John J. Holland, with engines provided by the Moran Brothers.

The vessel's first owner was Henry Carstens, who had been a purser for the Oregon Railway and Navigation Company.  He intended to use the boat on the Snohomish River.  The vessel was 90 feet long.  In 1893, Carstens sold Monte Cristo to Ernest Shellgren, who owned a store in Longbranch, Washington, where he was also the postmaster.  Shellgren sold the vessel in 1896.

In 1898, Monte Cristo was sold to interests who took the vessel to Alaska for use on the Stikine River, which was then thought to be an alternative "All-Canadian" route to the Klondike gold rush. Monte Cristo was the second vessel to ascend the Stikine River in the 1898 season. The vessel was reregistered in Canada and rebuilt to be longer, narrower, and heavier.

In 1900, Monte Cristo was transferred to the Skeena River in British Columbia under the ownership of the firm of R. Cunningham and Son, of Port Essington, British Columbia, who were mounting a challenge to the domination of the Hudson's Bay Company on the Skeena River trade. Monte Cristo was later chartered by the Dominion government to be used again on the Stikine River for the construction of a telegraph line to the Yukon.

One source says Monte Cristo was abandoned in 1903; another gives the year as 1922.

See also
Robert Cunningham (entrepreneur)
Steamboats of the Skeena River
Steamboats of the Stikine River
Puget Sound Mosquito Fleet

Notes

References
 Affleck, Edwin L, ed. A Century of Paddlewheelers in the Pacific Northwest, the Yukon, and Alaska, Alexander Nicholls Press, Vancouver, BC (2000) 
 Downs, Art, Paddlewheels on the Frontier: The Story of British Columbia and Yukon Sternwheel Steamers, Superior Publishing, Seattle, WA (1972) 
 Findlay, Jean Cammon and Paterson, Robin, Mosquito Fleet of Southern Puget Sound, (2008) Arcadia Publishing 
 Turner, Robert D., Sternwheelers and Steam Tugs – An Illustrated History of the Canadian Pacific Railway's British Columbia Lake and River Service,  Sono Nis Press, Victoria, BC 1984 

1891 ships
Steamboats of Washington (state)
Passenger ships of the United States
Passenger ships of Canada
Paddle steamers of British Columbia
Ships built in Washington (state)
Steamboats of the Stikine River
Steamboats of the Skeena River